Thomas Lee Halkowski (born 1962) is a Delaware attorney in private practice and is a former nominee for judge of the United States Court of Federal Claims.

Biography 

Halkowski received a Bachelor of Science degree, cum laude, in 1985 from Marquette University. He received a Master of Science degree in 1986 from the University of Florida. He received a Juris Doctor, cum laude, in 1989 from the University of Wisconsin Law School. He began his legal career by serving as a law clerk for Judge Roger Andewelt of the United States Court of Federal Claims, from 1989 to 1990, and for  Judge Helen W. Nies of the United States Court of Appeals for the Federal Circuit, from 1990 to 1992. He served as a trial attorney in the Environment and Natural Resources Division of the United States Department of Justice, from 1992 to 2000. Since 2000, he has served as a Principal in the Delaware office of Fish & Richardson, P.C., where he primarily handles patent litigation in federal court.

Expired nomination to claims court 

On April 10, 2014, President Obama nominated Halkowski to serve as a Judge of the United States Court of Federal Claims, to the seat vacated by Judge Lynn J. Bush, whose term expired October 25, 2013. His nomination is currently pending before the Senate Judiciary Committee. He received a hearing on his nomination before the United States Senate Judiciary Committee on June 4, 2014. On June 19, 2014, his nomination was reported out of committee by voice vote.

On December 16, 2014, his nomination was returned to the President due to the sine die adjournment of the 113th Congress. On January 7, 2015, President Obama renominated him to the same position. 
On February 26, 2015, his nomination was reported out of committee by voice vote. His nomination expired on January 3, 2017, with the end of the 114th Congress.

References 

Delaware lawyers
Living people
Marquette University alumni
University of Florida alumni
University of Wisconsin Law School alumni
1962 births
Lawyers from Milwaukee